There are two species of lizard named panther anole:

 Anolis bimaculatus, endemic to the Caribbean Lesser Antilles
 Anolis leachii, endemic to the Caribbean